Lei Sheng (born 7 March 1984) is a Chinese left-handed foil fencer, six-time team Asian champion, 2012 individual Asian champion, two-time team world champion, three-time Olympian, and 2012 individual Olympic champion.

Career
Lei took up fencing because he liked Zorro. His results as a junior were unremarkable. The 2005–06 season saw his breakthrough: he climbed his first World Cup podium with a silver medal at La Coruña, followed by a victory at Espinho and a bronze medal at the Torino World Championships. He finished the season 5th in world rankings. In the following season he won the Bonn World Cup, the St Petersburg Grand Prix and the Montreal World Cup, along with a bronze medal in Venice. He placed third again in the World Championships after losing in the semifinals to Italy's Andrea Baldini.

He competed at the 2008 Beijing Olympics and was defeated in the quarter-finals by eventual gold medallist Benjamin Kleibrink. At the 2012 London Olympics, he won the gold medal in men's individual foil after defeating  Egypt's Alaaeldin Abouelkassem with a score of 15-13.

Along with 2013 world champion Miles Chamley-Watson of the United States, Lei was named “athlete role model” for the Nanjing 2014 Youth Olympic Games. He was also chosen to bear the Chinese flag at the 2014 Asian Games and the 2016 Summer Olympics. Lei is the first ever Chinese Olympic athlete competing in a summer sport other than basketball to carry the Chinese flag in the opening ceremony.

Medal Record

Olympic Games

World Championship

Asian Championship

Grand Prix

World Cup

References

1984 births
Living people
Chinese male foil fencers
Fencers at the 2008 Summer Olympics
Fencers at the 2012 Summer Olympics
Fencers at the 2016 Summer Olympics
Olympic fencers of China
Olympic gold medalists for China
Asian Games medalists in fencing
Olympic medalists in fencing
Fencers from Tianjin
Medalists at the 2012 Summer Olympics
Fencers at the 2006 Asian Games
Fencers at the 2010 Asian Games
Fencers at the 2014 Asian Games
Asian Games gold medalists for China
Asian Games silver medalists for China
Asian Games bronze medalists for China
Medalists at the 2006 Asian Games
Medalists at the 2010 Asian Games
Medalists at the 2014 Asian Games
Universiade medalists in fencing
Guangzhou Sport University alumni
Universiade gold medalists for China
Universiade silver medalists for China
Medalists at the 2011 Summer Universiade
20th-century Chinese people
21st-century Chinese people